Buari is a town in the Kwara State of southwestern Nigeria, inhabited by the Yoruba people. The town shares a boundary with Okeya, Egi, Ilala and Esie.

Populated places in Kwara State